James "Dobby" Dobb (born 1972 in Derby) is an English former professional motocross racer. Amongst his achievements, he was crowned amca 125 world champion  Motocross World Champion in 2001, and was a top rider in the AMA motocross and supercross series during the mid-1990s.

Biography
Born into a motocross family, Dobb excelled at youth level, winning a host of domestic and European youth motocross titles. He turned professional in 1987, aged 15, signing a contract with the factory Cagiva team, widely acclaimed as a future world champion. In 1989, he won his first major adult title, the British 125cc Motocross championship, winning the 250cc category in 1990. 
In 1992, he was offered the chance to race in America, for the Pro-Circuit Kawasaki team, headed by Mitch Payton. During his five-year stint in America, Dobb would race for Pro-Circuit Kawasaki, Suzuki America and the Honda of Troy team. Whilst not winning any major titles, he was one of the series' top riders, winning an AMA National at Southwick.

Unfortunately, injury affected his 1996 season, and he was left without a ride for 1997. Disenchanted with the sport, he briefly pursued a modelling career in New York, before receiving an offer to return to Europe, competing for the Suzuki UK team. Dobb excelled on his return to Europe, winning the 1998 British 125cc Motocross championship, and a best finish of fifth in the World 125cc Motocross championship in 1999. His good form saw him  move to the factory KTM team in 2000, a move which gave him the momentum to challenge for the 125cc world title. He was second to fellow KTM rider Grant Langston in 2000, before dominating the 2001 championship, securing his, and Great Britain's, first title in the 125cc World Championship. Dobb's title victory was a welcome relief for British motocross in 2001, with much of the domestic season cancelled due to the country's foot and mouth outbreak.

He moved to the premier MX1 class in 2002, but injury, and an uncompetitive KTM 250 machine, meant that he was unable to challenge Stefan Everts for the title. After a lacklustre 2003 season, he returned to MX2, with the RWJ Honda team for 2004. However, unable to mount a serious title challenge, Dobb retired from professional motocross midway through the 2004 season.

Since retiring from motocross, Dobb has pursued a successful business career in sports management. He is currently mentoring his motocross protégé, MX2 factory rider Tommy Searle, as he seeks to emulate Dobb in MX2.

References 

1972 births
Sportspeople from Derby
Living people
British motocross riders